Ubuntu Restricted Extras is a software package for the computer operating system Ubuntu that allows the user to install essential software which is not already included due to legal or copyright reasons.

It is a meta-package that installs:
Support for MP3 and unencrypted DVD playback
Microsoft TrueType core fonts
Adobe Flash plugin
codecs for common audio and video files

Background 

The software in this package is not included in Ubuntu by default because Ubuntu maintainers want to include only completely free software in out-of-the-box installations. The software in this package may be closed-source, encumbered by software patents, or otherwise restricted. For example, the Adobe Flash plugin is a closed-source piece of software. Additionally, many multimedia formats such as MP3 and H.264 are patented. In countries where these patents apply, legally distributing software that use these formats may require paying licensing fees to the patent owners.

Contents 
The Ubuntu Restricted Extras is a metapackage and has the following dependencies:
 flashplugin-installer
 gstreamer0.10-ffmpeg
 gstreamer0.10-fluendo-mp3
 gstreamer0.10-pitfdll
 gstreamer0.10-plugins-bad
 gstreamer0.10-plugins-ugly
 gstreamer0.10-plugins-bad-multiverse
 gstreamer0.10-plugins-ugly-multiverse
 icedtea6-plugin
 libavcodec-extra-52
 libmp4v2-0
 ttf-mscorefonts-installer
 unrar

Starting with Ubuntu 10.10, several of these dependencies are included indirectly via another meta-package ubuntu-restricted-addons which is included by default.

Inclusion
Due to the legal status of the software included in Ubuntu Restricted Extras, the package is not included by default on any Ubuntu CDs. However, some distributions, such as Super OS, Pinguy OS and Revamplinux do bundle the package on their installation CDs or DVDs. For a listing of the formats offered via this repository, follow the link at the end of this paragraph to help/ubuntu.com, Ubuntu's official online wiki. 

Note that the above statement DOES NOT imply that the software is pirated or in any way illegal to download. Furthermore, it doesn't imply that Canonical is somehow breaking the law by offering the software. In fact, the _restricted_ repository exists for the sole purpose of making it easier to follow the law in the event that the software becomes unusable in its current form. That is what is meant by "Due to the legal status...". for an explanation of this concept, see this source.

See also

deb format

References

Linux package management-related software
Ubuntu